William Kay may refer to:

Politicians
William Kay (politician) (1829–1889) businessman and politician in South Australia
William A. Kay (1864-1931), American politician
William Frederic Kay (1876–1942), Canadian politician

Sports
William Kay (cricketer) (1893-1973), Australian cricketer
Will Kay (born 1984), rugby player
Bill Kay (baseball) (1878–1945), outfielder in Major League Baseball
Bill Kay (defensive back) (born 1960), former American football player, a defensive back for the Houston Oilers.
Bill Kay (tackle) (1925-2007), American football player, a tackle for the New York Giants.
Billy Kay (wrestler) (born 1989), Australian professional wrestler

Baronets
Sir William Kay, 2nd Baronet (died 1850) of the Kay baronets
Sir William Algernon Kay, 5th Baronet (1837–1914) of the Kay baronets
Sir William Algernon Ireland Kay, 6th Baronet CMG DSO (1876–1918) of the Kay baronets

Others
William Kay (journalist), British financial and business journalist
William Kay (priest) (1894–1980), Anglican Provost of Blackburn
William Kay (scholar) (1820–1886), English cleric and academic
Billie Kay (born 1989), Australian professional wrestler
Billy Kay (actor) (born 1984), American film and television actor
Billy Kay (writer) (born 1951), writer, broadcaster and language activist
William Kay (Mormon bishop), namesake of Kaysville, Utah

See also
William Kaye (disambiguation)